Battlestations! is a science fiction novel by American writer Diane Carey, part of the Star Trek: The Original Series franchise.

Plot
Lt. Commander Piper is taking a vacation from Starfleet following the events of the novel Dreadnought!, in which she prevented a military coup from taking over the Federation. However she is swept up into intrigue when Captain Kirk is arrested for the theft of transwarp drive, a new technology which could radically shift the balance of power across the galaxy. Piper, Commander Spock, and Dr. McCoy attempt to solve the mystery as the major powers of the galaxy scramble for the new technology.

Reception

Mark Chappell of TV Zone described the novel as "a cut above the standard fare of Titan's Star Trek novels" though it was "not as fresh as Dreadnought".

References

External links

Novels based on Star Trek: The Original Series
1986 American novels
1986 science fiction novels
American science fiction novels
Novels set in the 23rd century